American Underdog is a 2021 American biographical sports film about National Football League (NFL) quarterback Kurt Warner. Directed by Andrew and Jon Erwin, the film follows Warner's journey as an undrafted player who ascended to winning Super Bowl XXXIV. It stars Zachary Levi as Warner, alongside Anna Paquin as his wife Brenda and Dennis Quaid as his head coach Dick Vermeil.

The film was released theatrically in the United States on December 25, 2021, by Lionsgate. It received mostly positive reviews from critics and grossed over $26 million.  American Underdog was nominated for the GMA Dove Award for Inspirational Film/Series of the Year at the 2022 GMA Dove Awards.

Plot 
The film starts out with a young Kurt Warner who watches Super Bowl XIX. He makes a lifelong commitment to become a Super Bowl and MVP quarterback.

Several years later, Kurt is playing his fifth year for the University of Northern Iowa (UNI) Panthers football team with coach Terry Allen, and nothing was going Warner's way. Allen threatens to bench Warner after repeatedly not staying in the pocket after dropping back to pass, which would effectively end Warner's NFL dream. After a brutal practice following the coach's orders, Kurt continues to be the starter and his numbers climb to a point where he has a chance at the Draft.

Meanwhile, Kurt becomes attracted to a woman he sees dancing at a country bar. He decides to learn how to dance to impress her. He finds out her name is Brenda and that she is a single mom with two kids and is a nursing student struggling financially. Even though she doesn't think it will work out, Kurt becomes persistent and walks three miles to her house to get her number and finds out that she was a Marine corporal and that her son is disabled. He instantly bonds with the children and they decide to give it a try.

With his last season of college football over, Kurt anxiously awaits the draft. He doesn't get picked and wonders why God gave him a dream that he would never obtain. He later finds out that the Green Bay Packers gave him the chance to try out. The tryout goes badly and Kurt goes home dejected. Becoming homeless, he moves in with Brenda and lives in the basement. He takes a job at a Hy-Vee grocery store, working nights stocking shelves. He finds out that success is not found on the football field, but how one acts when confronted with disappointments.

Brenda's parents sell the house and move to another state, putting them in a tough situation, and the couple continue to struggle. At one point, their car runs out of gas and Kurt walks several miles in a blizzard to get to the nearest gas station.

Kurt gets approached by Jim Foster, who offers him the quarterback position for the Arena Football League's Iowa Barnstormers. Kurt agrees after he finds that no one in the NFL is interested in him.

Arena football is different as it is smaller and much more fast-paced. He loses his first game but wins the next game. Kurt and Brenda's relationship is strained from the long commute, and they briefly break up. Brenda's parents are killed in a tornado and she and Kurt decide to get back together. They get married and Kurt finishes the 1996 Arena Football League season with the Iowa Barnstormers in ArenaBowl X, a heartbreaking loss when his completed pass on the last play of the game comes up one yard short of the end zone.

Kurt is given another chance when he gets invited to a tryout by the St. Louis Rams. He doesn't think he will make it as he is having to re-adjust to normal football and the offensive coordinator, Mike Martz, berates him relentlessly for every mistake. The head coach, Dick Vermeil, believes in him and tells Kurt he made the team. When starting quarterback Trent Green goes down with an injury in the 1999 NFL preseason, Kurt eventually becomes the starting quarterback.

In his first game, Kurt and the Rams face a strong Baltimore Ravens defense led by linebacker Ray Lewis. After a turnover on his first drive, Kurt picks the Ravens' defense apart. With a 27–10 lead, the Rams go into victory formation, and Warner takes a knee to end the game. He immediately gives thanks to God for the opportunity and kisses Brenda in the stands.

The Rams would post a 13–3 record that season and become known as The Greatest Show on Turf because of the high-powered offense led by Warner. The Rams would go on to defeat the Tennessee Titans in Super Bowl XXXIV. During the game, Kurt would throw the most passing yards in a Super Bowl, breaking Joe Montana's record. Doing so helped him win Super Bowl MVP and be crowned the NFL MVP, making him the first undrafted player to be named either of those in NFL history.

The credits show that he would play in two other Super Bowls, become enshrined in the Pro Football Hall of Fame in 2017, and he and Brenda continue to live happily married with seven children.

Cast 
 Zachary Levi as Kurt Warner
 Beau Hart as young Kurt Warner
 Anna Paquin as Brenda Warner
 Dennis Quaid as Dick Vermeil
 Chance Kelly as Mike Martz
 Cindy Hogan as Sue Warner
 Ser'Darius Blain as Mike Hudnutt
 Adam Baldwin as Terry Allen
 Bruce McGill as Jim Foster
 Danny Vinson as Larry
 Hayden Zaller as Zack Warner
 Cora Kate Wilkerson as Jesse Jo Warner
 OJ Keith Simpson as Marshall Faulk
 Nic Harris as Ray Lewis

Other real life people depicted in the film include Steve Mariucci, Reggie White, Brett Favre, Trent Green, Isaac Bruce, Mike Holmgren, Ty Detmer, Az-Zahir Hakim, Rod Woodson, and Tony Siragusa.

Production 
A biopic about Kurt Warner was announced in February 2020, when Andrew and Jon Erwin were hired to direct the film, under the title American Underdog: The Kurt Warner Story. In September 2020, it was announced Zachary Levi would star as Warner. In January 2021, Anna Paquin and Dennis Quaid were among the additional cast added to the film.

Filming began on January 25, 2021, and concluded on March 6. Shooting occurred in Atlanta and Oklahoma City. The film's title was later shortened to American Underdog, with the release of the film's marketing and the announcement of the Christmas release date.

Release 
The film was released on December 25, 2021. It was previously scheduled to be released on December 18, 2021, but was delayed from a previous December 10, 2021 date, due to the delayed filming schedule during the COVID-19 pandemic. The film premiered at the TCL Chinese Theatre in Los Angeles in December 15, 2021.

Home media
The film was released on digital rent on February 4, 2022 and was released through Blu-ray and DVD on February 22, 2022.

Reception

Box office 
In the United States and Canada, American Underdog was released alongside A Journal for Jordan and the wide expansion of Licorice Pizza. The film made about $1 million from advanced screenings the week prior to its official opening. It ended up grossing $5.9 million from 2,813 theaters and finishing fourth at the box office; men made up 52% of the audience, with those over the age of 25 comprising 79% of ticket sales. The film earned $3.9 million in its second weekend, $2.3 million in its third, $1.6 million in its fourth, $1.2 million in its fifth, $1.16 million in its sixth, and $780,697 in its seventh. The film dropped out of the box office top ten in its eighth weekend, finishing fifteenth with $226,212.

Critical response
On review aggregator website Rotten Tomatoes, the film holds an approval rating of 75% based on 68 reviews, with an average rating of 6.6/10. The website's critics consensus reads: "American Underdog sticks to the standard inspirational sports drama playbook—and proves once again that it can be very effective in the right hands." On Metacritic, it has a weighted average score of 53 out of 100 based on 14 critics, indicating "average reviews". Audiences polled by CinemaScore gave the film a rare average grade of "A+" on an A+ to F scale.

Comparisons to real events
A few events from Warner’s actual career were either omitted or different in the film. The film depicts Kurt Warner's first NFL playing time as being in the Rams 1999 season opener against the Ravens. In reality, he played in the Rams' week 17 game of their 1998 season against the 49ers. He only completed four of his eleven attempts for 39 yards. Warner had actually been on the team longer than Trent Green, who was signed on February 15, 1999, while Warner had signed with the Rams during the 1998 offseason and was allocated to NFL Europe, which is not mentioned in the film at all.  He and Brenda also lived in the basement of Kurt’s parents Cedar Rapids home, not Brenda's.

References

External links 
 

2021 biographical drama films
2021 independent films
2020s English-language films
2020s sports drama films
American biographical drama films
American football films
American independent films
American sports drama films
Biographical films about sportspeople
Films directed by the Erwin Brothers
Films postponed due to the COVID-19 pandemic
Films produced by Kevin Downes
Films scored by John Debney
Lionsgate films
St. Louis Rams
2020s American films